Jan Kukal (born 13 September 1942) is a former professional tennis player who competed for Czechoslovakia.

Career
Kukal won the Czechoslovakian National Championships in 1968, the same year that he played his first Davis Cup tie for his country. He went on to appear in a total of 16 Davis Cup ties and finished with a 13-11 career record, which included five singles wins. In 1969 he was a member of the Czechoslovak team that won Europe's King's Cup.

He reached four Grand Prix/WCT doubles finals during his career, for one win, at Des Moines in 1973.

At Grand Slam level his best performance was a semi-final appearance in the doubles event at the 1972 French Open, with Jan Kodeš.

Coaching
Kukal began his coaching career while he was still playing. In 1972 he was coach of the Romania Davis Cup team and he coached the Dutch team the following year. From 1981 to 1983, he coached Czechoslovakia in the Davis Cup. During that time he was also Czechoslovak Fed Cup captain and led them to the 1983 Federation Cup title. He then coached the Austria Davis Cup team, from 1984 to 1990, and captained the Czech Republic Davis Cup team from 1999 until 2003.

Grand Prix/WCT career finals

Doubles: 4 (1–3)

References

1942 births
Living people
Czech male tennis players
Czechoslovak male tennis players
Czech tennis coaches
Tennis players from Prague